Bella Rosenfeld Chagall (15 November 1895, Vitebsk – 2 September 1944, New York State) was a Jewish Russian writer born in Vitebsk, Russian empire (Now Bielorussia) and the first wife of painter Marc Chagall. She was the subject of many of Chagall's paintings including Bella au col blanc (Bella with White Collar) in 1917, and appears posthumously  in Bouquet près de la fenêtre, painted in 1959–1960.

Timeline of her biography
1895 Bella Rosenfeld was born into the wealthy Jewish family of a Vitebsk jeweler. 
1909 She met Marc Chagall, at that time, a penniless apprentice of Léon Bakst. According to Marc, their love started the moment they saw each other and continued for 35 years. 
1915 they were married and moved to Petrograd.  
1916 she gave birth to their daughter Ida.  
1918 they returned to Vitebsk
1922 they emigrated to Lithuania and then to Germany. 
1924 they moved to Paris.
1939 they moved to the south of France
1941 arrested in Marseille and then fled to the United States
2 September 1944 Bella died from a bacterial infection
1946 Posthumously, Bella Chagall's most famous book, The Burning Lights, was published.

Works 
 The Burning Lights. Translation by Norbert Guterman. New York: Schocken Books Inc., 1946. 268 pp. 8vo, with thirty-six black and white illustrations by Marc Chagall.
 
 
Yiddish 
 Brenendike likht (The Burning Lights), with drawings by Marc Chagall. New York: Book League of the Jewish People's Fraternal Order, IWO, 1945. Yiddish. 254 pp.
 Di ershte bagegenish (The First Encounter), with drawings by Marc Chagall. New York: Book League of the Jewish People's Fraternal Order, IWO, 1947. Yiddish. 230 pp.

Bibliography
Shishanov V. «These young people were socialists … ». Participants of revolutionary movement in Marc Chagall and Belly Rozenfeld's environment // Bulletin of the Museum of Marc Chagall. 2005. №13. P. 64-74. 
Shishanov, V. «Wishing to arrive...» (Documents on study Belly Rozenfeld on the Moscow higher female courses)// The Chagalovsky sbornik. Release. 3. Materials X – XIV Chagalovsky readings in Vitebsk (2000–2004). Minsk: «Riftur», 2008. P.176-182.

1895 births
1944 deaths
Writers from Vitebsk
Belarusian Jews
Russian Jews
Russian artists' models
Yiddish-language writers
20th-century American novelists
American women novelists
Jewish American novelists
Marc Chagall
20th-century American women writers
Emigrants from the Russian Empire to Germany
German emigrants to France
French emigrants to the United States